The Asian Football Confederation's 1999 AFC Women's Championship was held from 7 to 21 November 1999 in the Philippines.

The tournament was to be originally hosted only in Iloilo City and Bacolod but due to continuous rains affecting the conditions of the pitch at the Iloilo Sports Complex, some matches were held in nearby Barotac Nuevo.

The tournament was won by China in the final against Chinese Taipei before an audience of 7,000 at the Panaad Stadium in Bacolod.

Match officials
10 referees and 9 assistant referees were selected to officiate the matches.

Group stage

Group A

Group B

Group C
Matches were held in Iloilo City and Barotac Nuevo (UTC+8)

Best teams in second place

Knockout stage

Semi-final

Third place match

Final

Winner

References

External links
 RSSSF.com

Women's Championship
AFC Women's Asian Cup tournaments
International association football competitions hosted by the Philippines
Afc
AFC Women's Championship
AFC Women's Championship
AFC Championship